Capel may refer to:

People 
Capell, surname, includes a list of people with the surnames Capel and Capell
Capel (given name), includes a list of people with the given name Capel

Places

England
Capel, Kent, a village and civil parish near Tunbridge Wells
Capel, Surrey, a village and civil parish
Capel-le-Ferne, Kent
Capel St Andrew, Suffolk
Capel St Mary, Suffolk
RNAS Capel, a First World War airship station near Folkestone, Kent

Australia
Capel, Western Australia
Shire of Capel, Western Australia
Electoral district of Capel, Western Australia, a Legislative Assembly electorate from 2005 to 2008
Capel River, Western Australia

Other uses
HMS Capel, two Royal Navy ships
Cooperativa Agrícola Pisquera Elqui Limitada, the trademark of a Chilean spirits company, that produces pisco and wine

See also
Capels, West Virginia, an unincorporated community